Adaptin ear-binding coat-associated protein 2 is a protein that in humans is encoded by the NECAP2 gene.

Interactions 

NECAP2 has been shown to interact with AP1G1.

References

Further reading 

 
 
 
 
 
 
 
 
 

Human proteins